Balzac is an extinct town in Morgan County, in the U.S. state of Colorado. The GNIS classifies it as a populated place.

The community most likely was named after Honoré de Balzac, a French novelist.

References

Ghost towns in Colorado
Geography of Morgan County, Colorado